Wilhelm Friedrich "Gaius" de Gaay Fortman (8 May 1911 – 29 March 1997) was a Dutch jurist and politician of the Anti-Revolutionary Party (ARP), which later merged into the Christian Democratic Appeal (CDA) party.

De Gaay Fortman attended a Gymnasium in Dordrecht from June 1923 until September 1925 and the Amsterdams Lyceum from September 1925 until July 1929 and applied at the Free University Amsterdam in July 1929 majoring in Law and obtaining a Bachelor of Laws degree in June 1930 before graduating with a Master of Laws degree in July 1933 and worked as a researcher at the Free University Amsterdam from 5 July 1933 until 12 June 1936 when he got a doctorate as an Doctor of Law on 12 June 1936. De Gaay Fortman worked as a civil servant from April 1934 until January 1947 for the department of Agricultural Emergency Management of the Ministry of Economic Affairs from April 1934 until September 1935 and for the department of Legal Affairs of the Ministry of Agriculture and Fisheries from September 1935 until February 1938 and for the department of Employment Insurances of the Ministry of Social Affairs from February 1938 until January 1947 and as Deputy Director-General of the department for Employment Insurances from April 1939 until August 1943 and as Director-General of the department for Employment Insurances from August 1943 until January 1947. On 10 May 1940 Nazi Germany invaded the Netherlands and the government fled to London to escape the German occupation. During the German occupation De Gaay Fortman continued his work for the Ministry of Social Affairs and but sympathetic with the Dutch resistance against the German occupiers and worked as an editor for the underground newspaper Free Netherlands from January 1943 until May 1945. De Gaay Fortman worked as professor of Labour law, Privacy law and Property law at the Free University Amsterdam from 10 January 1947 until May 1973. He also served as Rector Magnificus of the Free University Amsterdam from 1 January 1961 until 1 January 1962 and from 1 January 1965 until 1 January 1972. De Gaay Fortman was elected as a Member of the Senate after the Senate election of 1960, taking office on 20 September 1960. After the Senate election of 1971 De Gaay Fortman was selected as Parliamentary leader of Anti-Revolutionary Party in the Senate, taking office on 11 May 1971.

After the election of 1972 De Gaay Fortman was appointed as Minister of the Interior and Minister for Suriname and Netherlands Antilles Affairs in the Cabinet Den Uyl, taking office on 19 December 1977. In March 1977 Gaius de Gaay Fortman announced that he would not stand for the election of 1977 but wanted tot return to the Senate. Following the resignation of Deputy Prime Minister and Minister of Justice Dries van Agt De Gaay Fortman took over both positions on 8 September 1977. The Cabinet Den Uyl was replaced by the Cabinet Van Agt–Wiegel on 19 December 1977.

De Gaay Fortman remained in active politics, he was elected again as a Member of the Senate after the Senate election of 1977, serving from 20 September 1977 until 10 June 1981. De Gaay Fortman was selected as a Member of the European Parliament and dual served in those positions from 13 March 1978 until 15 July 1979. Following the end of his active political career, De Gaay Fortman returned as a professor of privacy law, labor law and administrative law at the Vrije Universiteit Amsterdam, serving from 20 December 1977 until 10 February 1979. After his retirement De Gaay Fortman occupied numerous seats as a nonprofit director for supervisory boards for non-governmental organizations and research institutes (Organisation for Scientific Research, Institute of International Relations Clingendael, Transnational Institute, T.M.C. Asser Instituut and the Carnegie Foundation).

De Gaay Fortman was known for his abilities as a negotiator and consensus builder. De Gaay Fortman continued to comment on political affairs as a statesman until his death. His eldest son Bas de Gaay Fortman was also a politician, professor and author, he like his father had served in the Senate.

Biography

Early life
Wilhelm Friedrich "Gaius" de Gaay Fortman was born in Amsterdam on 8 May 1911 to an orthodox Reformed Protestant family. The De Gaay Fortman family were descendants of 17th century Walloon immigrant Jacques Le Gay, and became one of the foremost Neo-Calvinist families in the Dutch Patriciate, with prominent ministers, scholars, business people and politicians.

Politics
The Reformed De Gaay Fortman was a progressive politician of the Anti-Revolutionary Party, the party which later merged with other Christian parties to form the Christian Democratic Appeal politician. He was a Public servant, secretary of the government labour negotiation team and a teacher at the CNV-school (Christian Labour Union). Later he became a professor at the Vrije Universiteit and its Rector Magnificus. In 1956 he was unsuccessful as informateur during the long 1956 cabinet formation. However, he was able in 1960 to quickly resolve a cabinet crisis. In 1973 he, together with Boersma, were persuaded to become a minister in the Cabinet Den Uyl. He had a good relationship with the formerly Reformed social-democrat party leader Joop den Uyl. As Minister of Home Affairs he proposed a plan to divide the Netherlands into 24 mini-provinces and he played a key role in the independence negotiations for Suriname in 1975. In 1981 he again acted in a cabinet formation as informateur and managed to pave the way for a government of CDA, PvdA and D66. De Gaay Fortman was in favor of co-operation of the ARP and later the CDA with the PvdA (left). He refuted offered positions in Christian Democrat – Liberal coalitions. De Gaay Fortman became a member of the CDA, but he became alienated from the party mainstream. In his view the CDA too much emphasised policies that resulted in the dismantling of social security. In the parliamentary elections of 1994 he endorsed Gert Schutte, the leader of the Reformed Political League. He is buried at Zorgvlied cemetery.

His son Bas de Gaay Fortman followed in the political footsteps of his father and became leader of the Political Party of Radicals in the Second Chamber and later a Senator for its successor, the GreenLeft party.

Decorations

References

External links

Official
  Mr.Dr. W.F. de Gaay Fortman Parlement & Politiek
  Mr.Dr. W.F. de Gaay Fortman (CDA) Eerste Kamer der Staten-Generaal

 
 

 
 
 

 

1911 births
1997 deaths
Anti-Revolutionary Party MEPs
Christian Democratic Appeal politicians
Commanders of the Order of the Netherlands Lion
Deputy Prime Ministers of the Netherlands
Dutch academic administrators
Dutch legal scholars
Dutch legal writers
Dutch magazine editors
Dutch newspaper editors
Dutch nonprofit directors
Dutch nonprofit executives
Dutch people of Walloon descent
Dutch people of World War II
Grand Officers of the Order of Leopold II
Grand Officers of the Order of Orange-Nassau
Grand Officiers of the Légion d'honneur
Honorary Order of the Yellow Star
Labour law scholars
Members of the Royal Netherlands Academy of Arts and Sciences
Members of the Senate (Netherlands)
Ministers of Kingdom Relations of the Netherlands
Ministers of Justice of the Netherlands
Ministers of the Interior of the Netherlands
MEPs for the Netherlands 1958–1979
Politicians from Amsterdam
People from Dordrecht
Politicians from The Hague
Rectors of universities in the Netherlands
Recipients of the Order of the House of Orange
Reformed Churches Christians from the Netherlands
Scholars of administrative law
Scholars of privacy law
Scholars of property law
Vrije Universiteit Amsterdam alumni
Academic staff of Vrije Universiteit Amsterdam
Writers from Amsterdam
Writers from The Hague
20th-century Dutch civil servants
20th-century Dutch educators
20th-century Dutch jurists
20th-century Dutch male writers
20th-century Dutch politicians
Members of the European Commission of Human Rights